Le Goff is a Breton surname. Its English equivalent is Smith. Notable people with the name include:

 Élie Le Goff (1858–1938), French sculptor
 Eugène Le Goff (1909–1998), French racing cyclist
 Jack Le Goff (1931–2009), French equestrian and coach
 Jacques Le Goff (1924–2014), French historian and author
 Nicolas Le Goff (born 1992), French volleyball player
 Vincent Le Goff (born 1989), French footballer
 Yves Le Goff (1907–1988), French racing cyclist

See also 
 Goff (disambiguation)

Surnames of French origin